Interlagos is a district in São Paulo, Brazil.

Interlagos may also refer to:
 Autódromo José Carlos Pace, a race course
 A version of Alpine A108 car
 A model of Opteron microprocessor